Eugene McIntyre was a member of the Wisconsin State Assembly in the USA.

Biography
McIntyre was born on May 29, 1847, in what is now Lyndon, Sheboygan County, Wisconsin. In 1871, McIntyre married Rosabelle C. Harmon. They had five children. He died in 1927.

Assembly career
McIntyre was a member of the assembly in 1880. He was a Republican.

References

External links
"Eugene McIntyre ", Find A Grave

People from Lyndon, Sheboygan County, Wisconsin
Republican Party members of the Wisconsin State Assembly
Millers
1847 births
1927 deaths
Burials in Wisconsin